Keilor East railway station is a railway station currently under construction as a part of the Melbourne Airport railway line that will serve the suburbs of Keilor East, Keilor Park and Airport West. It is scheduled to open in 2029.

History 
The Melbourne Airport Rail project plans to build a new Metro line through the north-west of Melbourne using the rail reservation currently used by the Albion-Jacana freight corridor. Since the announcement of the project, local councils have advocated for a station to be added to serve nearby suburbs, arguing the area is currently underserved by public transport.

In September 2022, the Victorian Government announced the project would add a station on the border of Keilor East and Airport West, connecting 150,000 people to the metropolitan rail network. According to media reports, the Government did not plan to include the new station in the initial project, but after local advocacy and the public intervention of Public Transport Minister Ben Carroll in parliament, the project's business case was supplemented to add the station. 

The Government's supplementary business case argued delivering the station at the same time as the link would save 15% compared with building the station after the line was operational.

Services and platforms 
The station will be situated along the Melbourne Airport rail link, as part of two planned stations along the line. Trains will run from Melbourne Airport to Keilor East before continuing to Sunshine, through the Metro Tunnel and then along the Pakenham/Cranbourne lines. Services are planned to run every ten minutes all-day.

Trains will take 6 minutes to travel to Melbourne Airport, 8 minutes to Sunshine, and 27 minutes to the Melbourne CBD.

References 

Railway stations in Melbourne
Proposed railway stations in Melbourne
Railway stations in the City of Brimbank